The streamline chub (Erimystax dissimilis) is one of the 324 fish species found in Tennessee.

Geographic distribution
Found in the Ohio River basin from western New York to northern Indiana and south to northern Alabama, and in the St. Francis and White River drainages in Missouri and Arkansas.

References
https://web.archive.org/web/20111002015239/http://www.bio.utk.edu/hulseylab/Fishlist.html

Freshwater fish of the United States
Erimystax
Fish described in 1841